Boonsboro is a town in Washington County, Maryland, United States, located at the foot of South Mountain. It nearly borders Frederick County and is proximate to the Antietam National Battlefield. The population was 3,336 at the 2010 census.

History

Local lore asserts Boonsboro was founded by George Boone, a cousin of Daniel Boone, and was originally named "Margaretsville" after his wife. The town was incorporated as Boonesborough in 1831. Local newspapers and villagers preferred the name Boonsboro. The former name was used on some documents as late as 1903.

Boonsboro was a key town during the American Civil War. Two battles were fought in its present borders. The town was also used to keep wounded soldiers after the Battle of Antietam in September 1862. Southeast of the town was the site of the Battle of South Mountain.

Boonsboro lies on what used to be the National Road. Today it is known as either the Old National Pike or Alt-U.S. 40. In Boonsboro it is Main Street. The route was originally established as a road improvement project in 1758 to shorten travel between Fredericktown and Fort Frederick during the Seven Years' War.  The route began from the existing (old) road at today's Marker road, passed through Turner's Gap, Boonsboro and turned west along today's MD. Rt. 68 to Williamsport.  The route from Boonsboro to Funkstown was later adopted as part of the National Turnpike route.

The town suffered a fire at the former Asaro's (its successor Vesta moved to the building across) in 2007, and a fire at the former inn in 2008. That fire completely gutted the inn, which was on the verge of being renovated and reopened. The Inn BoonsBoro finally opened a year later; it is owned by best-selling romance novelist Nora Roberts.

The Boonsboro Historic District, Bowman House, Ingram-Schipper Farm, Keedy House, St. Mark's Episcopal Church, and Washington Monument are listed on the National Register of Historic Places.

Geography

Boonsboro is located just 1 mile west of the Appalachian Trail and is a popular spot for Hikers.

Boonsboro is the starting point for the JFK 50 mile race held every year in November.

Demographics

2010 census
As of the census of 2010, there were 3,336 people, 1,237 households, and 879 families residing in the town. The racial makeup of the town was 95.4% White, 2.1% African American, 0.1% Native American, 1.0% Asian, 0.1% Pacific Islander, 0.5% from other races, and 0.7% from two or more races. Hispanic or Latino of any race were 2.7% of the population.

There were 1,237 households, of which 37.3% had children under the age of 18 living with them, 55.8% were married couples living together, 10.4% had a female householder with no husband present, 4.9% had a male householder with no wife present, and 28.9% were non-families. 24.3% of all households were made up of individuals, and 10.5% had someone living alone who was 65 years of age or older. The average household size was 2.58 and the average family size was 3.06.

The median age in the town was 40.8 years. 24.3% of residents were under the age of 18; 6.7% were between the ages of 18 and 24; 26.1% were from 25 to 44; 26.6% were from 45 to 64; and 16.2% were 65 years of age or older. The gender makeup of the town was 46.6% male and 53.4% female.

2000 census
As of the census of 2000, there were 2,803 people, 1,068 households, and 723 families residing in the town. The racial makeup of the town was 98.04% White, 0.75% African American, 0.11% Native American, 0.18% Asian, 0.04% Pacific Islander, 0.14% from other races, and 0.75% from two or more races. Hispanic or Latino of any race were 0.75% of the population.

There were 1,068 households, out of which 34.5% had children under the age of 18 living with them, 52.2% were married couples living together, 11.8% had a female householder with no husband present, and 32.3% were non-families. 27.2% of all households were made up of individuals, and 15.4% had someone living alone who was 65 years of age or older. The average household size was 2.47 and the average family size was 3.04.

In the town, the population was spread out, with 25.5% under the age of 18, 5.9% from 18 to 24, 28.4% from 25 to 44, 20.3% from 45 to 64, and 19.9% who were 65 years of age or older. The median age was 40 years. For every 100 females, there were 85.3 males. For every 100 females age 18 and over, there were 76.5 males.

The median income for a household in the town was $40,476, and the median income for a family was $48,155. Males had a median income of $37,683 versus $25,673 for females.  The per capita income for the town was $19,430. About 7.8% of families and 7.9% of the population were below the poverty line, including 6.4% of those under age 18 and 14.1% of those age 65 or over.

Government

Boonsboro has a seven-member Town Council, which serves as the legislative body of the Town. In Boonsboro, from 1831 through 1939, Mayors (originally called Burgesses) were elected annually. From 1940 through 1975, they served two-year terms. Since 1976, Mayors have been chosen for four-year terms, except for the previous mayor, who had been in office from 1988 through 2016.

Boonsboro's current Mayor is Howard W. Long.

Previous Mayors include:

 1831-1835 Jonathan Shafer
 1835-1836 David Brookhart
 1836-1837 Lewis Fletcher
 1837-1838 Joseph O'neal
 1838-1839 Anthony McBride
 1839-1840 Joseph Knox
 1840-1841 Charles Perry
 1841-1843 Jacob Smith
 1843-1845 James Chambers
 1845-1846 Andrew Newcomer
 1846-1847 Lewis Fletcher
 1847-1848 James Chambers
 1848-1850 David Gilbert
 1850-1851 David H. Keedy
 1851-1852 J. C. Brining
 1852-1853 William H. Miller

 1853-1854 P. B. Stuffing
 1854-1855 J. C. Brining
 1855-1856 John Stonesifer
 1856-1857 Lauton Miller
 1857-1859 James Chambers
 1859-1862 Joseph O'helper
 1862-1864 James Chambers
 1864-1865 George Numan
 1865-1867 Josiah Knodle
 1867-1868 Jacob Blecman
 1868-1869 David Schlosser
 1869-1872 John H. Smith
 1872-1874 Anslem Watery
 1874-1876 Elias Cost
 1876-1877 George Hoffmeister

 1877-1880 William Welck
 1880-1881 Thomas E. Smith
 1881-1882 John Murdock
 1882-1883 George Nyman
 1883-1885 John H. Lakin
 1885-1886 John C. Brining
 1886-1887 William E. Itnyre
 1887-1888 A. M. V. B. Deaner
 1888-1889 Frank Smith
 1889-1891 John R. Fletcher
 1891-1892 John E. Smith
 1892-1893 Matthew O'Brn
 1893-1894 M. L. Storm
 1894-1895 Eli Wade
 1895-1897 James P. Ford
 1897-1898 Frank E. Newcomer

 1898-1899 William L. Irwin
 1899-1901 John R. Fletcher
 1901-1902 O. J. Stotlemyer
 1902-1904 Elias E. Martz
 1904-1905 C. C. Ford
 1905-1906 George M. Stover
 1906-1909 G. J. Roudabush
 1909-1910 Elias E. Martz
 1910-1911 G. J. Roudabush
 1911-1912 H. G. Routzahn
 1912-1916 G. J. Roudabush
 1916-1917 George M. Stover
 1917-1919 J. L. Danner
 1919-1920 H. P. Lynch
 1920-1921 Harvey J. Huffer
 1921-1925 George McBride

 1925-1926 Oscar Morgan
 1926-1929 George McBride
 1929-1934 H. S. Bomberger
 1934-1935 Alfred C. Huffer
 1935-1938 D. Frank Miller
 1938-1940 John Hershberger
 1940-1942 John Hershberger
 1942-1960 John B. Wheeler
 1960-1970 John L. Herr
 1970-1974 Kenneth E. Ramsburg
 1974-1976 Edward T. Weaver
 1976-1980 Stuart L. Mullendore
 1980-1988 John L. Herr
 1988-2016 Charles F. (Skip) Kauffman, Jr.
 2016–Present Howard W. Long

Education

Boonsboro is served by a  educational complex.  It consists of the following schools:

 Boonsboro Elementary School
 Boonsboro Middle School
 Boonsboro High School

The current principal of Boonsboro High School is Sherry Hamilton.

Transportation

The primary means of travel to and from Boonsboro is by road. Five main highways serve the town, with the most prominent of these being U.S. Route 40 Alternate. US 40 Alt follows Main Street through central Boonsboro, linking westward to Hagerstown and eastward to Frederick. In addition to US 40 Alt, Maryland Route 34 connects Boonsboro to Sharpsburg, Maryland Route 66 connects the town to Interstate 70, Maryland Route 67 connects it to U.S. Route 340, and Maryland Route 68 links to Interstate 81 and Williamsport.

Notable people

 Janet Doub Erickson, co-founder of the Blockhouse of Boston, artist and educator (born in Hagerstown Hospital to a Boonsboro farming family, she spent her childhood there).
 William Thomas Hamilton, 38th Governor of Maryland, U.S. Senator, & U.S. Congressman for Maryland's 2nd District and 4th District.  Born in Boonsboro on 8 September 1820.
 Edwin R. Keedy (1880–1958), Dean of the University of Pennsylvania Law School 
 The late Charlotte Winters, 109, once the oldest surviving female American World War I veteran. Served in the navy.
 Nora Roberts, author of over 170 romantic novels and entrepreneur of several businesses in Boonsboro.

Area attractions
 Crystal Grottoes
 Washington Monument State Park
 Greenbrier State Park
 Old South Mountain Inn
 Stoney Creek Farm
 South Mountain State Battlefield
 Boonsboro cantaloupes
 Inn Boonsboro (Themed bed and breakfast owned by Nora Roberts)
 Boonesborough Museum of History
 Boonsboro Trolley Museum
 Bowman House
 The Yellow House

References

External links

 Town of Boonsboro Website

 
Towns in Washington County, Maryland
Hagerstown metropolitan area
South Mountain Range (Maryland−Pennsylvania)
Towns in Maryland
1790s establishments in Maryland
1792 establishments in the United States